Gingerbread Men is an album by trumpeter Clark Terry and trombonist Bob Brookmeyer featuring tracks recorded in 1966 and originally released on the Mainstream label.

Reception

Allmusic's  Jason Ankeny awarded the album 4 stars and states "Perhaps because trumpeter Clark Terry and trombonist Bob Brookmeyer spent the majority of their respective careers as sidemen, they retain a remarkable spirit of generosity and unity as leaders. For all the virtuosity on display across Gingerbread Men, what impresses most is the selfless coherence of the session as a whole".

Track listing
 "Haig and Haig" (Clark Terry) - 4:24  
 "I Want a Little Girl" (Billy Moll, Murray Mencher) - 4:00  
 "Mood Indigo" (Barney Bigard, Duke Ellington, Irving Mills) - 6:46  
 "Milo's Other Samba" (Gary McFarland) - 2:48  
 "Gingerbread Boy" (Jimmy Heath) - 2:32  
 "My Gal" (Terry) - 5:30  
 "Naptown" (Alan Foust) - 5:28  
 "Morning Mist" (Hank Johnson) - 3:12  
 "Bye Bye Blackbird" (Ray Henderson, Mort Dixon) - 6:40

Personnel 
Clark Terry - trumpet, flugelhorn, vocals
Bob Brookmeyer - valve trombone
Hank Jones - piano
Bob Cranshaw - bass  
Dave Bailey - drums

References 

1966 albums
Clark Terry albums
Bob Brookmeyer albums
Mainstream Records albums
Albums produced by Bob Shad